The following is a list of ports in Sri Lanka. All ports and harbours in Sri Lanka are maintained and governed by the Government of Sri Lanka and the Sri Lanka Ports Authority.

List of ports

See also

External links 

 Sri Lanka Ports Authority
 Ministry of Ports & Aviation

 
Sri Lanka
Sri Lanka transport-related lists